Pampa Hermosa District may refer to:

 Pampa Hermosa District, Satipo in Peru
 Pampa Hermosa District, Ucayali in Peru